Ian Malcolm MacKeigan (1915 – 1 May 1996) was a Canadian lawyer and judge. He was Chief Justice of Nova Scotia from 1973 to 1985. 

He resigned in 1985 as a result of the controversy surrounding the wrongful conviction of Donald Marshall Jr. He was later the lead appellant in Mackeigan v Hickman.

References 
 Celebrating the 250th Anniversary of the Supreme Court of Nova Scotia

Judges in Nova Scotia
Canadian lawyers
1915 births
1996 deaths